207th may refer to:
 Military
207th (Ottawa-Carleton) Battalion, CEF, battalion of the First World War Canadian Expeditionary Force
207th Infantry Division (Germany), border security unit during the invasion of Poland
207th Coast Artillery Anti-Aircraft Regiment, World War II US Army regiment
207th Pennsylvania Infantry, American Civil War (Union Army) regiment
207th Infantry Group (Scout), United States Army Alaska National Guard unit

 Transport
207th Street (IRT Broadway – Seventh Avenue Line), local station on the New York City Subway
207th Street Crosstown Line, public transit line in New York City serving the boroughs of Manhattan and The Bronx
207th Street Yard, rail yard of the New York City Subway system
Inwood – 207th Street (IND Eighth Avenue Line), the northern terminal station of the IND Eighth Avenue Line of the New York City Subway

See also
207 (number)
207, the year 207 (CCVII) of the Julian calendar